The Northern Champion was a bi-weekly newspaper published in Taree, New South Wales, Australia from 1912 until 1961.

History
The Northern Champion was first published on 2 February 1912 by David A. Cowan. Mary Lucy Cowan (1872-1950) became proprietor and manager of the Northern Champion after the death of her brother David Cowan in 1922. In 1961 the Northern Champion was absorbed into the Manning River Times.

Digitisation
The paper has been digitised as part of the Australian Newspapers Digitisation Program project of the National Library of Australia.

See also
 List of newspapers in Australia
 List of newspapers in New South Wales

References

External links
 

Defunct newspapers published in New South Wales
Newspapers on Trove